Thomas Leeser (born December 12, 1952) is an American architect.  
He studied at the Technische Hochschule Darmstadt in Germany where he also got his master's degree in Architecture. 
He opened his own practice, Leeser Architecture in Brooklyn, New York, in 1989.

Thomas Leeser has been teaching architecture at nine different universities (Columbia University, Cornell University, Harvard University, Pratt Institute, Illinois Institute of Technology, Rensselaer Polytechnic Institute, Parsons School of Design, The Cooper Union, and Princeton University).

His trademark style insists on the design innovation and the integration of new technologies into physical spaces - specially in museums, theaters, educational and broadcast facilities, but also in commercial buildings or even entire city blocks. Some of Leeser's most iconic works are Museum of the Moving Image (New York City) and the 2012. London Olympic Park.

Notable projects
Museum of the Moving Image (New York City)
EmQuartier Retail Center Bangkok
BRIC Arts Media
Mercedes House NYC
60 Water Street Dumbo Brooklyn

External links
 Leeser Architecture
 BRIC TV Interview - Leeser Architecture: Caught in the Act

References

1952 births
Living people
21st-century American architects
German emigrants to the United States
Technische Universität Darmstadt alumni